Brialmont Cove is a cove in Hughes Bay, lying between Charles Point and Spring Point along the west coast of Graham Land in Antarctica. It was charted in 1898 by the Belgian Antarctic Expedition under Gerlache, who named it for Lieutenant-General Brialmont, a member of the Belgica Commission.

Further reading 
 Damien Gildea, Mountaineering in Antarctica: complete guide: Travel guide
 Ben Saul, Tim Stephens, Antarctica in International Law, P 827

External links 

 Brialmont Cove on USGS website
 Brialmont Cove on AADC website
 Brialmont Cove on SCAR website
 Satellite map of Brialmont Cove
 map of the area of Brialmont Cove

References
 

Coves of Graham Land
Danco Coast